Rufus Rivers "Rufe" Clarke (April 13, 1900 – February 8, 1983) was a Major League Baseball pitcher who played for the Detroit Tigers in  and .

External links

1900 births
1983 deaths
Detroit Tigers players
Major League Baseball pitchers
Baseball players from South Carolina
Davidson Wildcats baseball players
People from Hampton County, South Carolina